The Ely and Newmarket Railway was a railway company in England, which connected the city of Ely, Cambridgeshire to the town of Newmarket, Suffolk.

History

Unsuccessful schemes
A plan by the Newmarket Railway to link Newmarket with Ely had been authorised in June 1847, but the company got into financial difficulties during 1848 (with no work having been carried out on the Ely line), which led to the partial closure of their existing system in June 1850. Two more schemes were proposed for a railway between Ely and Newmarket, but these also failed.

Successful scheme
A fourth scheme put forward by the Ely and Newmarket Railway, and supported by the Great Eastern Railway, was successful, being authorised on 11 August 1875 and opening on 1 September 1879. The line connected into the Newmarket –  line at Warren Hill Junction. A year later a link was added from Chippenham Junction (west of Kennett station) to a new junction on the ENR route at Snailwell Junction. All lines were single when opened.

The ENR did not possess any locomotives or stock and all trains were operated by the Great Eastern Railway.

Take-over by GER
On 10 April 1888 the Great Eastern Railway (GER) agreed to lease the line for 999 years, backdated to 1 January 1888. The GER absorbed the line by an Act of Parliament dated 1 July 1898.

Notes

References

Great Eastern Railway
Railway companies established in 1875
Pre-grouping British railway companies
Railway companies disestablished in 1898